My Everything may refer to:

 My Everything (Anita Baker album), a 2004 album by Anita Baker
 My Everything (Ariana Grande album), a 2014 album by Ariana Grande, or its title song (see below)
 My Everything, a 2002 album by Helen Baylor
 "My Everything" (98 Degrees song), a 2000 song by 98 Degrees
 "My Everything" (The Grace song), a 2006 song by The Grace
 "My Everything", a song by Ariana Grande from My Everything
 "My Everything", a 2004 song by Goldfinger from Disconnection Notice
 "My Everything", a 2006 song by Monica from The Makings of Me
 "My Everything", a song by Jennifer Brown from Giving You the Best
 "My Everything", a 2015 song by Owl City from Mobile Orchestra

See also
 "You're the First, the Last, My Everything", a 1974 song by Barry White